Fazl-e-Akbar Durrani (born 20 October 1980) is a Pakistani cricketer. He is a right-handed batsman and a right-arm medium-fast bowler.

Akbar made his Test match in February 1998 in a match between South Africa and Pakistan. He had an early impact, taking his first Test wicket, that of Gary Kirsten, with his sixth ball after having earlier dropped a catch from him. He managed to only play four more Tests, his last in 2004. He continued to play domestic cricket in Pakistan until 2009.

References

1980 births
Zarai Taraqiati Bank Limited cricketers
Cricketers from Peshawar
Khyber Pakhtunkhwa cricketers
Living people
Pakistan Customs cricketers
Pakistani cricketers
Pakistan International Airlines cricketers
Pakistan One Day International cricketers
Pakistan Test cricketers
Peshawar cricketers
Peshawar Panthers cricketers